Patrick Selim Atiyah,  (5 March 1931 – 30 March 2018) was an English lawyer and academic. He was best known for his work as a common lawyer, particularly in the law of contract and for advocating reformation or abolition of the law of tort. He was made a Fellow of the British Academy in 1979.

Biography
Patrick Selim Atiyah was born on 5 March 1931. He was a son of the Lebanese writer Edward Atiyah and his Scottish wife Jean. The mathematician Sir Michael Atiyah was his brother. As a child, Patrick lived in Sudan and Egypt. The family moved to England in 1945. Patrick attended primary school at Woking County Grammar School for Boys and went on to read law at Magdalen College, Oxford.

Atiyah was professor of law at the Australian National University (1970–1973), at the University of Warwick (1973–1977) and professor of English law at the University of Oxford (1977–1988). He also was visiting Professor of Law at Harvard Law School (1982-1983).

He died on 30 March 2018.

Bibliography
Books
Essays on Contract (1986), Oxford University Press, Digital Reproduction available at Google Books (2001) 
Atiyah's Accidents, Compensation and the Law (1970), now (2006) and updated by Peter Cane
The Rise and Fall of Freedom of Contract (1979) Oxford University Press
Promises, Morals, and Law (1983) Oxford University Press
Form and Substance in Anglo-American Law (1987).
An Introduction to the Law of Contract (1995 5th Ed.) Clarendon Law Series, now updated by Stephen Smith.
The Damages Lottery (1997) Hart Publishing.

Articles
'Economic Duress and the Overborne Will' (1982) 98 LQR 197. Atiyah argued that it was wrong to use the phrase 'coercion of the will' in the test for duress. Duress does not eliminate free choice, it just creates a choice between evils. What is wrong about a contract is not an absence of consent, but the wrongful nature of the threats used to bring about consent.

See also
Tort reform

Notes

1931 births
2018 deaths
Academics of the University of Warwick
Academic staff of the Australian National University
British people of Lebanese descent
English barristers
English King's Counsel
Fellows of the British Academy
Fellows of St John's College, Oxford
English legal scholars
English legal writers
Scholars of contract law
Scholars of tort law
Legal scholars of the University of Oxford
English male non-fiction writers
Atiyah family
20th-century English lawyers